Sierra Marie Lelii (born May 4, 1993) is an American soccer player who plays as a striker for Skautafélag Reykjavíkur in the Icelandic 2. deild.

Early life
Born and raised in Seminole, Florida, Lelii attended Seminole High School where she scored 74 goals and recorded 40 assists during her high school career. In January 2010, she helped the team win the Class 5A state title.

College
Lelii attended Nova Southeastern University between 2011 and 2015, playing four seasons for the Nova Southeastern Sharks in the Sunshine State Conference (SSC), injury redshirting in her junior year. As a senior in 2015, Lelii was an All-American and All-Region selection, winning multiple All-Conference awards including SSC Offensive Player of the Year. She set the new program single-season goals record and led the SSC in goals with 18.

Playing career

Orlando Pride
Lelii was called into Orlando Pride preseason camp on March 14, 2016. She played in all of the team's preseason games and was named to the amateur squad ahead of the 2016 season. On July 10, 2016, Lelii was promoted to the first team roster following the temporary loss of six Pride players to their respective Olympic teams. She was named in the matchday squads for games against the Boston Breakers, Chicago Red Stars and Seattle Reign FC but did not play.

Skövde
In August 2016, Lelii signed with Skövde KIK, a non-league team in Skövde, Sweden. She made her debut for the club on August 20, scoring a goal and registering an assist in a 5–3 win over Skepplanda BTK. In six appearances for the team, Lelii scored three goals and made five assists.

Þróttur
On March 16, 2017, Lelii signed with Icelandic 1. deild club Þróttur based in Reykjavík. She worked as a strength and conditioning coach alongside playing.

Haukar
In February 2019, Lelii joined fellow 1. deild club Haukar.

SR
In 2021, Lelii signed with Skautafélag Reykjavíkur of the Icelandic 2. deild.

Career statistics

References

External links
 Nova Southeastern player profile

Living people
1993 births
American expatriate women's soccer players
American women's soccer players
Expatriate women's footballers in Iceland
Expatriate women's footballers in Sweden
Sierra Lelii
People from Seminole, Florida
Nova Southeastern Sharks women's soccer players
Orlando Pride players
Sportspeople from Pinellas County, Florida
Soccer players from Florida
Women's association football forwards
American expatriate sportspeople in Iceland
American expatriate sportspeople in Sweden